The Wermland Open was a golf tournament on the Challenge Tour and the Swedish Golf Tour. It ran from 1985 to 1990 and was always played in Karlstad, Värmland County, Sweden.

Winners

Notes

References

External links
Official coverage on the Challenge Tour's official site

Former Challenge Tour events
Swedish Golf Tour events
Golf tournaments in Sweden
Recurring sporting events established in 1985
Recurring sporting events disestablished in 1990
1985 establishments in Sweden
1990 disestablishments in Sweden